Orakel / Tiefe is the debut studio album of Peter Frohmader, released in 1986 by Auricle and Dark Star Records. It was remastered and issued on CD for the first time on October 13, 2014 by Cosmic Egg for a limited run of 20 pressings.

Track listing

Personnel
Adapted from the Orakel / Tiefe liner notes.
Musicians
 Peter Frohmader – PPG Wave synthesizer, gongs (A), timpani (A), production, recording, cover art
 Rudi Haunreiter – drums (A), timpani (A)
 Stephan Manus – violin (A)
Production and additional personnel
 H. R. Giger – photography

Release history

References

External links 
 

1986 debut albums
Peter Frohmader albums